The Xiamen Zhangzhou Bridge is a  bridge across the Jiulong River estuary as the river enters Xiamen Bay.

Construction of the bridge began in August 2009. The bridge was opened in May, 2013.

The bridge carries traffic between the Haicang District in Xiamen to the north of the bay and Longhai, Zhangzhou to the south. The bridge has reduced the travel time across the bay from 2 hours down to 30 minutes.

See also
List of longest cable-stayed bridge spans
List of tallest bridges in the world
List of longest bridges in the world

References

External links

Bridges in Fujian
Bridges completed in 2013
Cable-stayed bridges in China
Toll bridges in China